Dave Brown was a member of the Montana House of Representatives.

Biography
Brown was born on November 20, 1948 in Pompey's Pillar, Montana. He pled guilty in 1994 to five counts of failing to file federal income tax returns.

He died on October 23, 1998 in Madison, Wisconsin.

Career
Brown was a member of the House of Representatives from 1981 to 1993.

References

Members of the Montana House of Representatives
1948 births
1998 deaths
People from Yellowstone County, Montana
20th-century American politicians